Minquan may refer to:

Principle of Minquan, one of the Three Principles of the People
Minquan County, in Henan, China
Minquan Subdistrict, Henan
Minquan Subdistrict, Hubei